Hazel Murphy may refer to:

Hazel Murphy, character on Sealab 2021
Lester and Hazel Murphy House; see National Register of Historic Places listings in Hood River County, Oregon